The 2019–20 EHF Cup was the 39th edition of the EHF Cup, the second most important European handball club competition organised by the European Handball Federation (EHF), and the seventh edition since the merger with the EHF Cup Winners' Cup.
On 24 April 2020 EHF announced that EHF Cup would be cancelled due to COVID-19 pandemic.

Team allocation

Teams

Round and draw dates
The schedule of the competition was as follows (all draws were held at the EHF headquarters in Vienna, Austria).

Qualification stage
The qualification stage consists of three rounds, which will be played as two-legged ties using a home-and-away system. In the draws for each round, teams are allocated into two pots, with teams from Pot 1 facing teams from Pot 2. The winners of each pairing (highlighted in bold) will qualify for the following round.

For each round, teams listed first will play the first leg at home. In some cases, teams agree to play both matches at the same venue.

Round 1
A total of 32 teams entered the draw for the first qualification round, which was held on Tuesday, 16 July 2019. The draw seeding pots were composed as follows:

The first legs were played on 31 August–1 September and the second legs were played on 7–8 September 2019. Some teams agreed to play both matches in the same venue.

|}
Notes

1 Both legs were hosted by KH BESA Famgas.
2 Both legs were hosted by Maccabi Rishon LeZion.
3 Both legs were hosted by ZTR Zaporizhia.
4 Both legs were hosted by Beşiktaş Aygaz.
5 Both legs were hosted by Handball Esch.
6 Both legs were hosted by RK Vojvodina.
7 Both legs were hosted by RK Dubrava.

Round 2
The first legs were played on 5–6 October and the second legs were played on 12–13 October 2019. Some teams agreed to play both matches in the same venue.

|}
Notes

1 Both legs were hosted by Talent M.A.T. Plzeň.
2 Both legs were hosted by SL Benfica.
3 A penalty shootout – which lasted nine shots for each team – was necessary to determine the winner of the tie between ALPLA HC Hard and Skjern Handbold. ALPLA HC Hard won 9–8.

Round 3
A total of 32 teams entered the draw for the third qualification round, which was held on Tuesday, 15 October 2019. The draw seeding pots were composed as follows:

The first legs were played on 16–17 November and the second legs were played on 23–24 November 2019.

|}

Group stage 

The draw of the EHF Cup group stage will take place on Thursday, 28 November 2019. The 16 teams allocated into four pots will be drawn into four groups of four teams.

In each group, teams play against each other home-and-away in a round-robin format. The matchdays are  8–9 February, 15–16 February, 22–23 February, 29 February–1 March, 21–22 March and 28–29 March 2020.

On 25 March 2020, the EHF announced that no matches will be played before June due to the coronavirus pandemic.

In the group stage, teams are ranked according to points (2 points for a win, 1 point for a draw, 0 points for a loss). After completion of the group stage, if two or more teams have scored the same number of points, the ranking will be determined as follows:

Highest number of points in matches between the teams directly involved;
Superior goal difference in matches between the teams directly involved;
Highest number of goals scored in matches between the teams directly involved (or in the away match in case of a two-team tie);
Superior goal difference in all matches of the group;
Highest number of plus goals in all matches of the group;
If the ranking of one of these teams is determined, the above criteria are consecutively followed until the ranking of all teams is determined. If no ranking can be determined, a decision shall be obtained by EHF through drawing of lots.

During the group stage, only criteria 4–5 apply to determine the provisional ranking of teams.

Group A

Group B

Group C

Group D

Ranking of the second-placed teams
The top three second-placed teams will qualify to the quarter-finals.  The ranking of the second-placed teams will be determined on the basis of  the team's results in the group stage.

Knockout stage

Quarter-finals
The draw for the quarter-final pairings was scheduled to be held on Tuesday, 31 March, in the EHF headquarters in Vienna, but due to the postponed matches of the group stage, EHF will announce any further updates accordingly. On 24 April 2020 the matches were cancelled.

|}

Final four
The eighth edition of the EHF Cup Finals in 2020 will be hosted by Füchse Berlin after the EHF Executive Committee decided to award the hosting rights to the German club at its meeting on 22 November 2019. The tournament was scheduled to take place at Max-Schmeling-Halle in Berlin, on 23 and 24 May 2020, but was rescheduled to 29 and 30 August 2020. On 24 April 2020 EHF announced that in agreement with the organizers, Füchse Berlin, the MEN’S EHF Cup Finals scheduled for 29 and 30 August are cancelled. The tournament will not be carried out.

Bracket

Semifinals

Third place game

Final

Top goalscorers

See also
2019–20 EHF Champions League
2019–20 EHF Challenge Cup

References

External links
Official website

 
EHF Cup seasons
EHF Cup
EHF Cup
EHF Cup